Keith Outten (1947−2022) was an Australian rugby league footballer who played in the 1960s and 1970s.

Playing career
A five-eighth, Outten played four seasons with Balmain between 1968 and 1971. During this period, he won a premiership with the Tigers when he played five-eighth in the 1969 Grand Final. 

Outten made a successful shift to the North Sydney Bears for three seasons between 1972 and 1974, before returning to Balmain for one final season in 1975. He captain-coached the rural club Yanco before retiring as a player. He died on 26 October 2022 following a long illness at the age of 75

References

1947 births
2022 deaths
Balmain Tigers players
Australian rugby league players
North Sydney Bears players
Rugby league halfbacks
Rugby league five-eighths